Solenopsis aurea, also commonly called the golden fire ant, is a species of ant native to the southwestern United States and Northern Mexico. Workers have a pale golden coloration with occasional brown spots.

References 

aurea
Insects described in 1906